The Carmelite is a tragic play by the British writer Richard Cumberland. It was first staged at the Drury Lane Theatre on 2 December 1784. The play's hero Saint-Valori disguises himself as a Carmelite. The play enjoyed some success, and was later staged a theatre in Belfast where Wolfe Tone saw it in 1791.

References

Bibliography
 Moody, TW (ed.). The writings of Theobald Wolfe Tone: 1763 - 98. Volume I, Tone's career in Ireland to June 1795. Oxford University Press, 1998.
 Nicoll, Allardyce. A History of English Drama 1660-1900. Volume III: Late Eighteenth Century Drama. Cambridge University Press, 1952.
 Watson, George. ''The New Cambridge Bibliography of English Literature: Volume 2, 1660–1800. Cambridge University Press, 1971.

Plays by Richard Cumberland
1784 plays